The Cortona Triptych is a Catholic Church depiction of the Madonna and Child with saints, painted by Fra Angelico. It is now kept at the Diocesan Museum in Cortona, Italy. The painting dates from 1436–1437.

The triptych was originally painted for the church of San Domenico in Cortona, and belonged to the Order of Saint Dominic. It was painted in Fiesole, and then shipped to Cortona, probably just before Fra Angelico painted the Perugia Altarpiece in 1437, with which this work shares many common elements.

Predella
The predella depicts the story of Saint Dominic along with other saints:

 Saint Peter Martyr  
 The dream of Innocent III, 
 Saint Michael the Archangel
 Resurrection of Napoleone Orsini 
 Saint Vincent, Martyr
 Saint Dominic with the Friars, being served by the Angels and Death of St. Dominic
 Saint Thomas Aquinas

Sources

External links

 Cortona web

1430s paintings
Paintings by Fra Angelico
Paintings of the Madonna and Child
Paintings in Cortona
Christian art
Christian iconography
 Paintings on gold backgrounds
Triptychs
Paintings of Peter of Verona
Paintings of Thomas Aquinas
Paintings depicting Michael (archangel)
Paintings of Vincent of Saragossa
Paintings of Saint Dominic
Popes in art